Archibald Bell may refer to:
 Archibald Bell (writer) (1776–1854), Scottish writer
 Archibald Bell Sr. (1773–1837), Australian politician
 Archibald Bell Jr. (1804–1883), Australian politician and writer
 Archibald Bell (cricketer) (1868–1948), Guyanese cricketer
 Archie Bell (footballer) (born 1965), Scottish footballer
 Archie Bell (singer) (born 1944), American singer
 Arch Bell (1905–1978), Australian footballer